Arzanaq may refer to:
 Arzanaq, Ardabil
 Arzanaq, East Azerbaijan